Dilobeia is a genus of trees in the family Proteaceae. It is endemic to Madagascar and contains two recognised species. It is most closely related to the genera Cenarrhenes (Tasmania) and Beaupreopsis (New Caledonia).

References

External links

Proteaceae
Proteaceae genera
Endemic flora of Madagascar